Eugenius (died 303/304) was a Roman usurper in Syria during the Tetrarchy. He was a tribune of 500 soldiers stationed in Seleucia Pieria, who proclaimed him emperor in 303. He marched with his troops to Antioch, where he fell in battle.

References

Sources
 DiMaio, Michael, "Eugenius (303/304 A.D.)" DIR

4th-century Roman usurpers
300s deaths
Year of birth unknown
Year of death uncertain
Romans from unknown gentes
Ancient Romans killed in action
Tetrarchy
Pieria (Syria)
People of Roman Syria